James Patrick Roche (1886 – 7 June 1917) was an Irish athlete who competed at the 1908 Summer Olympics in London for the United Kingdom. In the 100 metres, Roche won his first round heat with a time of 11.4 seconds to advance to the semifinals.  He finished third in his semifinal race, not advancing to the final. With a time of 22.8 seconds, Roche won his preliminary heat of the 200 metres.  In that event, he had slightly better success in the semifinals but still lost to countryman George Hawkins.  Hawkins edged out Roche for the win (and the right to advance to the final); both were timed at 22.6 seconds.

Roche was born in Cork, son of Stephen and Elsie Roche. He was later brought up at Cahirciveen, County Kerry.

He was killed in action in France during World War I. He had been awarded the Military Cross, and at the time of his death was serving as a Captain in the 47th Trench Mortar Battery of the Royal Field Artillery. He was buried at Kemmel Chateau Military Cemetery.

See also
 List of Olympians killed in World War I

References

Further reading

External links
 
 

1886 births
1917 deaths
British male sprinters
Olympic athletes of Great Britain
Athletes (track and field) at the 1908 Summer Olympics
British military personnel killed in World War I
Sportspeople from County Cork
Irish male sprinters
Royal Field Artillery officers
British Army personnel of World War I